William John "Willie" Thompson (26 October 1939 – 12 December 2010) was a Northern Irish Ulster Unionist Party (UUP) politician. He served as Member of Parliament (MP) for West Tyrone from 1997 to 2001. He was one of the UUP members opposed to the Good Friday Agreement.

Elections in the 1970s and 1980s
He had previously been elected from the Mid Ulster constituency as an Ulster Unionist for the 1973 and 1982 Assemblies and the Northern Ireland Constitutional Convention in 1975. In 1983 he sought election to Westminster in the Mid Ulster constituency, however he finished fourth with 7,066 votes, losing to the DUP's Willie McCrea.

References
 CAIN Archive
 Maiden Speech : House of Commons 26 June 1997
House of Commons debate : Omagh – 2 Sept 1998

External links 
 

Members of the Parliament of the United Kingdom for County Tyrone constituencies (since 1922)
UK MPs 1997–2001
Members of the Northern Ireland Assembly 1973–1974
Members of the Northern Ireland Constitutional Convention
Northern Ireland MPAs 1982–1986
Ulster Unionist Party members of the House of Commons of the United Kingdom
1939 births
2010 deaths